Steen Steensen Blicher (11 January 1899 – 1 August 1965) was a Danish amateur association football player in the defender position, who competed with the Denmark national football team at the 1920 Summer Olympics. Born in Copenhagen, he played his club football with Kjøbenhavns Boldklub, winning the Danish championship in 1917, 1918, 1922, and 1925. He made his national team debut in October 1918, and played 27 games and scored five goals until June 1929. He died on 1 August 1965, while living at Frederiksberg, Copenhagen.

He was the father of Danish international footballer Steen Blicher.

References

Sources
Danish national team profile
Haslund.info profile
Palle "Banks" Jørgensen: "Landsholdets 681 Profiler", TIPS-bladet, 2002. 

1899 births
1965 deaths
Danish men's footballers
Kjøbenhavns Boldklub players
Denmark international footballers
Footballers at the 1920 Summer Olympics
Olympic footballers of Denmark
Association football defenders
Footballers from Copenhagen